Moses Walton (April 2, 1775 – March 13, 1847) was a nineteenth-century Virginia farmer who served in both houses of the Virginia General Assembly representing Shenandoah County.

Early and family life
The son of Moses Walton Jr. and his wife, the former Eunice Borden Rogers, shared the name of his father and grandfather, and his grandson  Moses Walton would also serve in the Virginia House of Delegates.

Moses Walton married , and his children who survived to adulthood included Reuben Moore Walton (1799-1874) and Mary Ann Walton (1807-1879).

Career

Walton farmed in Shenandoah county, and also occasionally served as sheriff. He owned three enslaved person in the 182 U.S. Federal Census and four in the 1840 U.S. federal census.

Shenandoah County voters elected Moses Walton to represent them in the Virginia House of Delegates (part-time) three times for one year terms; he served first alongside John Colville and later along with Samuel Bare between 1820 and 1823. After a break, he ran and was elected to represent both Shenandoah and Rockingham County in the Virginia Senate. After the Virginia Constitutional Convention of 1829–1830, the redistricted Senate combined Shenandoah and Hary County and Joel Pennybacker won the seat.

Death

Moses Walton died on March 13, 1847, and was buried at the Union Church Cemetery in Mt. Jackson in Page County, Virginia. His grandson Moses Walton would represent both Shenandoah and Page Counties in the Virginia Constitutional Convention of 1868.

References

People from Shenandoah County, Virginia
Virginia state senators
Members of the Virginia House of Delegates
19th-century American politicians
1775 births
1847 deaths